URBEX – Enter At Your Own Risk (abbreviated URBEX) is an 8-part original series that launched globally on Red Bull TV on August 1, 2016. Urbex is a documentary series that chronicles the motivations, mindsets and adventures of today's new type of explorers, Urban Explorers,  who explore areas above, around and below the world's most famous cities, climbing cranes and bridges, descending into subway networks, infiltrating monuments to industry and commerce old and new . Urbex stands for Urban Exploration. The series was filmed in locations across the world including Moscow, Melbourne, Malaysia, Mumbai, Copenhagen,  Kazakhstan, Dubai,  Toronto,  Marseille and Bulgaria with some of the world's most famous urban explorers like Oleg Cricket and Ontheroofs' Vitaliy Raskalov and Vadim Makhorov. The series was promoted with digital enhancement 360-degree videos.

Cast 
 Oleg Cricket:  A fearless Russian daredevil who is not afraid of doing stunts that even the most seasoned athletes wouldn't dare to do.
 Abudi Alsagoff: A professional freerunner and parkour athlete from Malaysia.
 Vitaliy Raskalov:  YouTube sensation who became infamous due to jaw dropping videos of free-climbing some of the tallest bridges and skyscrapers like the Shanghai Tower.
 Vadim Makhorov: YouTube sensation who together with Vitaliy, is the creator of the acclaimed photography project Ontheroofs.
 Elaina Hammeken: Born in Switzerland, this Danish daredevil coined Copenhagen's Catwoman used to be a pro snowboarder but her career ended early due to an accident. She was a contestant on America's Next Top Model while obtaining her master's degree in Economics & Finance in Copenhagen.
 Bryce Wilson: Australian Urban Explorer (aka Australia's Spider-Man) who has been taken to court for climbing sky scrapers in Melbourne.
 Max Ross: California resident who was inspired by YouTube videos to start Urban Exploration himself. 
 David De Rueda: French photographer who has a passion to explore abandoned places.

Episodes

References

Documentary web series
Urban exploration